Mohammad Anis Sherzai (born 1934) was an Afghan field hockey player who competed at the 1956 Summer Olympic Games, playing in all three of his team's matches.

References

External links
 

Field hockey players at the 1956 Summer Olympics
Olympic field hockey players of Afghanistan
Afghan male field hockey players
Living people
1934 births